Sorkhei is a Western Iranian language.  It is spoken in village of Sorkheh in Semnan Province in northwestern Iran.

Trivia
During the Iran-Iraq War, radio operators from Sorkheh used the language as a form of cryptography for tactical communications of the Iranian Armed Forces.

During the Iran nuclear negotiations, the language was used in conversations between Iranian President Hassan Rouhani and Hossein Fereydoun, his brother and aide traveling with the negotiating team. This was done to eliminate or reduce comprehensibility of the conversation by any potential eavesdroppers.

Notes

Bibliography
 Pierre Lecoq.  1989.  "Les dialectes caspiens et les dialectes du nord-ouest de l'Iran," Compendium Linguarum Iranicarum.  Ed. Rüdiger Schmitt.  Wiesbaden:  Dr. Ludwig Reichert Verlag.  Pages 296-314.

 Habib Borjian. 2008. “The Komisenian Dialect of Aftar,” Archiv Orientální 76: 379-416. 

Northwestern Iranian languages